William Rodman (October 7, 1757 – July 27, 1824) was a member of the U.S. House of Representatives from Pennsylvania.

William Rodman was born in Bensalem Township, Pennsylvania, near Bristol, Pennsylvania.  He served in the American Revolutionary War as a private and subsequently as brigade quartermaster.  He commanded a company during the Whisky Rebellion in 1794.  He was a justice of the peace from 1791 to 1800, and a member of the Pennsylvania State Senate for the 1st district from 1799 to 1803.

Rodman was elected as a Republican to the Twelfth Congress.  He died at "Flushing" near Bristol and is interred at the St. James Episcopal Churchyard in Bristol, Pennsylvania.

Notes

Sources

The Political Graveyard

External links 
 

1757 births
1824 deaths
People from Bensalem Township, Pennsylvania
Pennsylvania state senators
Quartermasters
Democratic-Republican Party members of the United States House of Representatives from Pennsylvania